Hydrelia rufinota is a moth in the family Geometridae first described by George Hampson in 1896. It is found in India and China.

References

Moths described in 1896
Asthenini
Moths of Asia